The Foot-Ball Club was a football club, in Edinburgh, Scotland, formed in 1824. The club met in the summer months to play a form of football that did not resemble association football. Nevertheless, the organisation can claim to be the earliest recorded club playing football of any kind. A modern association football club with the same name was formed in 2007, in an attempt to revive the legacy of the old club.

History

The Foot-Ball Club of Edinburgh is thought to be one of the oldest recorded football clubs in the world with records going back to 1824. Membership lists and accounts of the club between 1824 and 1841 are held in the National Archives of Scotland (NAS).

Founded by John Hope in 1824, the club played its games in the city's Dalry Park until 1831, when they moved to Greenhill Park. The club appears to have met and played every summer, but there is no record of it after 1841.

In 2017, a brief set of handwritten rules was found on the back of the club's 1833 budget statement.  This has been described as the earliest known written rules of football.

Reformation
In 2007, an association football club with the same name was formed by Kenny Cameron, a community coach at Spartans, after a tour of the Scottish Football Museum. The club's men play in the Edinburgh Sunday Premier League and the Ladies play in the Scottish Women's Football League Second Division South East Division.

References

Sources
 1824: The World's First Foot-Ball Club, John Hutchinson and Andy Mitchell. Andy Mitchell Media, 2018. .

Football clubs in Edinburgh
Sports clubs established in the 1820s
1824 establishments in Scotland
History of football in Scotland
History of rugby union in Scotland
Defunct Scottish rugby union clubs